Planetary health refers to "the health of human civilization and the state of the natural systems on which it depends". In 2015, the Rockefeller Foundation and The Lancet launched the concept as the Rockefeller Foundation–Lancet Commission on Planetary Health.

History
The idea of planetary health has been around for some time. In 1993 the Norwegian physician Per Fugelli wrote: "The patient Earth is sick. Global environmental disruptions can have serious consequences for human health. It's time for doctors to give a world diagnosis and advise on treatment."

Twenty-one years later, a commentary in the March 2014 issue of the medical journal The Lancet called to create a movement for planetary health to transform the field of public health, which has traditionally focused on the health of human populations without necessarily considering the surrounding natural ecosystems. The proposal recognized the emerging threats to natural and human-made systems that support humanity.

In 2015, the Rockefeller Foundation and The Lancet launched the concept as the Rockefeller Foundation–Lancet Commission on Planetary Health.

Definition
Drawing from the definition of health – "a state of complete physical, mental and social wellbeing and not merely the absence of disease or infirmity" - as well as principles articulated in the preamble of the constitution of the World Health Organization, the report elaborated that planetary health refers to the "achievement of the highest attainable standard of health, wellbeing, and equity worldwide through judicious attention to the human systems – political, economic, and social – that shape the future of humanity and the Earth's natural systems that define the safe environmental limits within which humanity can flourish."

Principles
The Lancet Commission's report laid down the overarching principles guiding the idea of planetary health. One is that human health depends on "flourishing natural systems and the wise stewardship of those natural systems". Human activities, such as energy generation and food production, have led to substantial global effect on the Earth's systems, prompting scientists to refer to the modern times as the anthropocene.

A group of Earth system and environmental scientists led by Johan Rockström from the Stockholm Resilience Centre proposed the concept of nine planetary boundaries within which humanity can continue to develop and thrive for generations to come. According to a 2015 update, four of the planetary boundaries – climate change, biosphere integrity, biogeochemical flows, and land-system change – had already been exceeded.

The report concluded that urgent and transformative actions are needed to protect present and future generations. One important area which required immediate attention was the system of governance and organization of human knowledge, which was deemed inadequate to address the threats to planetary health.

The report made several overarching recommendations. One was to improve governance to aid the integration of social, economic, and environmental policies and for the creation, synthesis, and application of interdisciplinary knowledge. The authors called for solutions based on the redefinition of prosperity to focus on the enhancement of quality of life and delivery of improved health for all, together with respect for the integrity of natural systems.

Comparison with other fields
Planetary health is considered a response to existing fields and paradigms such as public health environmental health, ecohealth, One Health and international health.

While there may be competing definitions of global health, it is loosely defined as the health of populations in a global context, a response to the cross-border movement of health drivers as well as risks, and an improvement over the older concept of international health with its new emphasis on achieving equity in health among all people.  
The editor in chief of The Lancet Richard Horton wrote in a 2014 special issue of The Economist on planetary health, that global health was no longer able to truly meet the demands which societies face, as it was still too narrow to explain and illuminate some pressing challenges."Global health does not fully take into account the natural foundation on which humans live – the planet itself. Nor does it factor in the force and fragility of human civilizations."

Judith Rodin, president of the Rockefeller Foundation, declared planetary health as a new discipline in global health.

Issues

Planetary health concerns itself with governance and stewardship which pose a threat to the sustainability of the human civilization, environment, and planet. Specifically, it seeks to confront three main types of challenges: "imagination challenges", such as failing to account for long-term human or environmental consequences of human progress; "research and information challenges", such as underfunding and lack of scope in research; and "governance challenges", such as delayed environmental action by governing bodies determined by unwillingness, uncertainty, or non-cooperation.

A primary ethical focus of planetary health research is human cooperation and non-cooperation in the form of conflict, nationalism, and competition. As one goal, the Lancet Commission on Health and Climate Change plans to use an accountability mechanism to track human cooperation and study the link between health, climate, and political action.

Likewise, nutrition and diet are important contributors to and indicators of planetary health. Scientists speculate that human population growth threatens the carrying capacity of the planet. Diets, agriculture, and technology must adjust to sustain population projections upwards of 9 billion while reducing harmful consequences on the environment through food waste and carbon-intensive diets. A focus of planetary health research will be nutritional solutions that are sustainable for the human species and the environment, and the generation of scientific research and political will to create and implement desired solutions. In January 2019, an international commission created the planetary health diet.

Planetary health aims to seek out further solutions to global human and environmental sustainability through collaboration and research across all sectors, including the economy, energy, agriculture, water, and health. Biodiversity loss, exposure to pollutants, climate change, and fuel consumption are all issues that threaten human and climate health alike, and are, as such, foci of the field. A number of researchers think that it is actually humanity's destruction of biodiversity and the invasion of wild landscapes that creates the conditions for malaria, and new diseases such as COVID-19.

Developments since 2015
In December 2015, Harvard University, together with the Wildlife Conservation Society and other partner organizations, founded the Planetary Health Alliance to promote the concept. Funded by Rockefeller Foundation and housed in Harvard, the Alliance aims to support the development of "rigorous, policy-focused, transdisciplinary field of applied research aimed at understanding and addressing the human health implications of accelerating change in the structure and function of Earth's natural systems." The Alliance's initiatives include the Rockefeller Foundation Planetary Health Fellowship, a planetary health course for Harvard undergraduates, and a Planetary Health Annual Meeting, which was first held in April 2017 in Boston, MA.

The open-access journal "Lancet Planetary Health" published its inaugural issue in April 2017.

See also
Planetary diet
Planetary integrity
Planetary management
Gaia hypothesis

References

Further reading
 Coghlan et al.: A bolder One Health: expanding the moral circle to optimize health for all One Health Outlook, 2021.
Richard Horton Offline: Planetary health's next frontier—biodiversity The Lancet, Volume 390, No. 10108, p2132, 11 November 2017.

Global civilization